The 1969 World Junior Wrestling Championships were the first edition of the World Junior Wrestling Championships and were held in Colorado Springs, United States 1969.

Medal table

Medal summary

Men's freestyle

Men's Greco-Roman

References

External links 
 UWW Database
FILA Database

W
1969 in American sports
World Junior Championships
Wrestling in the United States